No. 298 Wing RAF was a wing of the Royal Air Force.

26 Squadron SAAF was seconded to 298 Wing RAF and was based at Takoradi, Gold Coast (Ghana), West Africa during the Second World War. They flew Vickers Wellingtons on anti-submarine and convoy escort duties over the Atlantic.

References

External links
26 Squadron SAAF Web Site (Unofficial)

Wings of the Royal Air Force in the Second World War
Military units and formations disestablished in 1945